The Bavarian football league system of the Bavarian Football Association ranks within the German football league system. Its highest division, the Regionalliga Bayern, is currently the fourth tier of German football. The lowest league in Bavaria is currently the C-Klasse, which is the 12th tier of German football.

In 2012, the league system experienced a major overhaul when the Regionalliga Bayern was established, the Bayernliga split into two regional divisions and the Landesliga expanded from three to five divisions.

The league system

Men
The top-tiers of the league system as operated from 2014–15 onwards:

Notes

All leagues on same level run parallel.
League strengths are nominal and may vary from season to season.

Recent changes 
In 1988, upon the suggestion of the 1. FC Sonthofen in 1986, the Bezirksoberligas were introduced in Bavaria, set between the already existing Landesligas and Bezirksligas.

In 1998, the Bavarian FA renamed the three lowest football leagues:

A-Klasse became Kreisliga
B-Klasse became Kreisklasse
C-Klasse became A-Klasse

On top of this, in some of the seven Bezirke, two new lowest levels were introduced and named B and C-Klasse. The reason for this was the integration of all reserve teams into the normal competition. In the Bezirke who did not follow suit, like Schwaben, the reserve teams of clubs in the Kreisliga and below still compete in separate, parallel leagues.

The Bavarian football federation carried out drastic changes to the league system at the end of the 2011–12 season. With the introduction of the Regionalliga Bayern from 2012–13, it placed two Bayernligas below the Regionalliga. Below those, five Landesligas instead of the existing three were set, which were geographically divided to limit travel and increase the number of local derbies.

Matrix
This is  a table of the progression of the Bavarian league system by tier since 1963:

 ‡ Since 1998 the B- and C- Klasse exist only in some parts of Bavaria.

Bavarian Cup

Until 2009, the seven Bezirke in Bavaria each played their own cup competition which in turn functioned as qualifier to the German Cup (DFB-Pokal). Starting in 1998 these seven cup-winners advanced to the Bavarian Cup. The two finalists of this competition then advanced to the German Cup.

Since 2009, the regional cup competitions were dissolved and qualifying competitions established instead for the lower amateur leagues. The teams in the higher divisions of Bavarian football entered the enlarged Bavarian Cup directly.

Reserve teams

In 1955, 1. FC Nuremberg Amateure became the first reserve team to enter the Bayernliga, followed by FC Bayern Munich Amateure. Despite this, reserve teams from non-professional clubs were not permitted to enter the league system for many years after that, having to play in parallel reserve leagues with promotion and relegation determined by the performance of the senior team rather than the reserve side.

Regulations were slowly lowered and, in 1980, reserve teams of Landesliga clubs were permitted to enter the league pyramid, too. However, should a club drop out of the Landesliga, its reserve side would have to return to reserve football.

With the introduction of the Bezirksoberliga in 1988, reserve teams from this league were permitted to enter regular league football, too. Some years later, this right was also awarded to Bezirksliga clubs. Bavaria was however slow to allow all reserve sides to enter the league system, differing in this from most other German associations. Eventually, this hurdle was dropped too, but the final decision was awarded to the individual Bezirke. Up to the fourth-lowest level, senior and reserve team can play at the same level, but not in the same league, higher than that reserve teams have to play one level below the senior side.

In between, in 2008, reserve sides lost their right to compete in the cup competitions. Since the 2011–12 season, Swabia, Lower Bavaria, Lower Franconia and Upper Franconia have gradually integrated many reserve teams fully into the league system while the other three Bezirke have all the reserves.

Professional clubs often designate their reserve sides to be under-23 teams as the rules of utilising players in both the first and second them for under-23 players are less strict, with players above 23 having to have a mandatory 10-day break when being exchanged between teams.

Women's and youth leagues
Apart from the men's leagues, the Bavarian FA also operates league systems of women's and male and female youth leagues.

In the women's league system, the Bayernliga, the fourth tier of the German league system, is set as the highest state league, with two regional Landesligas below, north and south. Below those, the Bezirksoberligas are set, followed by Bezirksligas, Kreisligas and Kreisklasses, just like the men's. No league exists below the Kreisklasse. Additionally, a women's youth league system also exists with the Under 17 Bayernliga as its highest tier.

In the men's youth league system, both in the Under 19's and Under 17's, the Bayernliga forms the top-tier which is the second division of German youth football. Below the Bayernliga, two Landesligas and seven Bezirksoberligas are set followed by the standard league system. The Under 15's differ in as much as the Bayernliga is split into two regional divisions and set underneath the Southern German Regionalliga. Below the two Bayernligas, Bezirksoberligas are set, followed by the standard league system.

In the Under 13's and below, not all statewide leagues exist, with competitions being very regional.

The top-level leagues in Bavaria since 2011–12 are:

 1 In two regional divisions.
 2 Only exists in some regions.

References

Sources
 Die Bayernliga 1945–1997,  published by the DSFS, 1998
 Deutschlands Fußball in Zahlen,  An annual publication with tables and results from the Bundesliga to Verbandsliga/Landesliga, publisher: DSFS
 Kicker Almanach,  The yearbook on German football from Bundesliga to Oberliga, since 1937, published by the Kicker Sports Magazine
 Süddeutschlands Fußballgeschichte in Tabellenform 1897–1988  History of Southern German football in tables, publisher & author: Ludolf Hyll
 50 Jahre Bayrischer Fußball-Verband  50-year-anniversary book of the Bavarian FA, publisher: Vindelica Verlag, published: 1996
 Die Deutsche Liga-Chronik 1945–2005  History of German football from 1945 to 2005 in tables, publisher: DSFS, published: 2006

External links 
 Bayrischer Fussball Verband (Bavarian FA)  
 Das deutsche Fussball Archiv   Historic German league tables
 Bavarian League tables and results  
 Website with tables and results from the Bavarian Oberliga to Bezirksliga 

Bav